Richard Sampson was an English bishop.

Richard Sampson may also refer to:

Richard Sampson (author) (1896–1973), English author who wrote under the name Richard Hull
Richard Sampson (cricketer) (1860–1927), English cricketer
Richard Sampson (MP) (fl. 1417), English MP for Maldon (UK Parliament constituency)
Richard Sampson (politician) (1877–1944), Australian politician
Richard Ian Colin Sampson (born 1955), Anglican cleric